The Striplin FLAC (Foot Launched Air Cycle) is an American flying wing ultralight aircraft that was designed by Ken Striplin in 1977, first flying in October 1978. The aircraft was supplied as a kit for amateur construction.

Design and development
It features a cantilever high-wing, a single-seat, partially enclosed cockpit, tricycle landing gear and twin  Soarmaster engines powering a single propeller in pusher configuration. Twin go-cart engines have also been employed.

The aircraft is made from aluminum tubing, foam, fiberglass, with the wings finished in doped aircraft fabric covering. Its  span wing features a laminar-flow airfoil, 50%-span elevons and wing tip rudders that can both be deployed simultaneously for use as air brakes. The aircraft has a 22:1 glide ratio. The FLAC has laminated fiberglass main landing gear legs and a nose wheel that is steerable. The aircraft was also designed to be at least nominally foot-launchable to comply with the informal US requirements for ultralights of that period that they be able to do so. Foot launching was carried out by opening a hinged door in the fuselage floor.

In flight the aircraft has been described as unstable, particularly in pitch and at least one accident was attributed to its instability.

Specifications (FLAC)

References

External links
Photo of a Striplin FLAC

1970s United States ultralight aircraft
Homebuilt aircraft
Twin-engined single-prop pusher aircraft
FLAC
High-wing aircraft
Aircraft first flown in 1978